The 1986–87 Iowa State Cyclones men's basketball team represented Iowa State University during the 1986–87 NCAA Division I men's basketball season. The Cyclones were coached by Johnny Orr, who was in his 7th season. They played their home games at Hilton Coliseum in Ames, Iowa.

They finished the season 13–15, 5–9 in Big Eight play to finish in 7th place.

Roster

Schedule and results 

|-
!colspan=6 style=""|Exhibition

|-
!colspan=6 style=""|Regular Season

|-
!colspan=12 style=""|Big Eight tournament

|-

References 

Iowa State Cyclones men's basketball seasons
Iowa State
Iowa State Cyc
Iowa State Cyc